Chimp or chimpanzee is a species of great ape native to the forests and savannas of tropical Africa.

Chimp(s) or The Chimp may also refer to:

The Chimp (1932 film), a Laurel and Hardy short film
Chimps: So Like Us, a 1980 documentary film
The Chimp (2001 film), a Kyrgyz film
Chimps Inc., an animal sanctuary in Oregon, United States

See also

 or 
 or 
Chimpanzee (disambiguation)